Robert Ritter von Dombrowski (2 April 1869 – 15 October 1932) was a Bohemian ornithologist who was the author of Ornis Romaniae (1912) and contributed to the eight volume treatise on hunting and forestry "Allgemeine Encyklopädie der gesammten Forst- und Jagdwissenschaften" edited by his father Raoul Ritter von Dombrowski.

Biography 
Robert was born in the Castle of Ullitz near Pilsen which was then in Austria. The family belonged to the Polish nobility originally spelled Dabrowski. His father Raoul was born at Paprosz near Prague. He studied at Kalksburg but left without completing as his father went bankrupt, lost most of his wealth in 1872, and retired in 1882. Raoul Ritter was the editor of an eight volume treatise on forestry and hunting "Allgemeine Encyklopädie der gesammten Forst- und Jagdwissenschaften" which was completed in 1894, the last volume assisted by Robert. Along with his brother Ernst (1862-1917), Robert worked at the Sarajevo Museum. Another brother Carl became a painter and writer. Robert was employed in 1895 by Grigore Antipa at the Bucharest Museum as a specimen preparator. He collected specimens for the museum and helped in developing the public exhibits. His work Ornis Romaniae consisted of 924 pages and covered 347 bird species of Romania. 

Dombrowski's career was interrupted by accusations that he encouraged the hunting and destruction of birds apart from selling specimens abroad. With the onset of World War I, Dombrowski, of Austrian origin was forced to move out of Romania. His collections went to the Grigore Antipa Museum.

References

Austrian ornithologists
1869 births
1932 deaths